The 1951 Dutch Grand Prix was a motor race held on 22 July 1951 at Circuit Park Zandvoort, Netherlands. It was the second Dutch Grand Prix set to Formula One rules.  The race was won for the second year in a row by French driver Louis Rosier in a Talbot-Lago.

Results

References

Dutch Grand Prix
Dutch Grand Prix
Grand Prix
Dutch Grand Prix